The 2020 GEICO 500 was a NASCAR Cup Series race held on June 22, 2020, at Talladega Superspeedway in Lincoln, Alabama. Contested over 191 laps -- extended from 188 laps due to an overtime finish, on the 2.66 mile (4.28 km) superspeedway, it was the 13th race of the 2020 NASCAR Cup Series season.

The race was originally scheduled to be held on April 26, but was rescheduled due to the COVID-19 pandemic. In turn, the race was postponed from June 21 due to inclement weather.

Report

Background

Talladega Superspeedway, formerly known as Alabama International Motor Speedway, is a motorsports complex located north of Talladega, Alabama. It is located on the former Anniston Air Force Base in the small city of Lincoln. A tri-oval, the track was constructed in 1969 by the International Speedway Corporation, a business controlled by the France family. Talladega is most known for its steep banking. The track currently hosts NASCAR's Cup Series, Xfinity Series and Gander RV & Outdoors Truck Series. Talladega is the longest NASCAR oval with a length of 2.66-mile-long (4.28 km) tri-oval like the Daytona International Speedway, which is 2.5-mile-long (4.0 km).

The GEICO 500 was the first NASCAR event since The Real Heroes 400 in May to admit a limited number of public spectators. Races had been held behind closed doors due to the COVID-19 pandemic, but the previous week's Dixie Vodka 400 was the first to admit spectators in grandstands — limited to an invited audience of local members of the U.S. military. Attendance was capped at 5,000 in grandstands and towers, with social distancing and mandatory masking enforced. A limited number of campsites above the Alabama Gang Superstretch were also opened. Tickets were being re-issued on a first come first served basis to local residents who had originally purchased tickets to the race before these changes.  Only the Cup race allowed spectators;  support races did not open grandstands, but Alabama Gang Superstretch campsites were open for those races.

Impact of the FIA's End Racism campaign and noose incident 
This was the first race open to spectators after NASCAR's decision to ban the Confederate battle flag following a pair of incidents -- a complaint by Bubba Wallace and the FIA's "End Racism" campaign by Sir Lewis Hamilton, since NASCAR is a founding member of the Automobile Competition Committee for the United States, the national governing body of motorsport designated by the FIA. On the day of the race, vendors outside of the track sold memorabilia carrying the flag, and a plane towing a banner with the flag and "Defund NASCAR" circled the track; NASCAR officials and Governor of Alabama Kay Ivey condemned the flyover, for which Sons of Confederate Veterans later claimed responsibility.

NASCAR reported that a noose had been found inside Wallace's stall, and stated that it would investigate it as a hate crime with the FBI. NASCAR president Steve Phelps threatened that anyone found responsible "will be banned from this sport for life. I don't care who they are, they will not be here." The United States Department of Justice Civil Rights Division also joined the investigation. As a sign of solidarity, other drivers and crew members pushed Wallace's car down pit road prior to the start of the race (which had been re-scheduled to June 22 due to rain), while "#IStandWithBubba" was painted on the infield grass.

On June 23, the FBI concluded that no hate crime targeting Wallace had occurred at the track, stating that the "noose" was a pulldown rope for a door, and had been present at the track since 2019. On June 25, NASCAR released a photo of the rope, and announced that it had investigated the stalls of all other NASCAR facilities — concluding that the pulldown rope in that stall was the only one that had been tied in such a manner.

Entry list
 (R) denotes rookie driver.
 (i) denotes driver who are ineligible for series driver points.

NOTE:  Garrett Smithley was added as a late addition after owner B. J. McLeod was inserted into the Spire Motorsports car following NASCAR rejecting the team's original plan of having James Davison in the car because he lacked NASCAR superspeedway experience in a situation where practice and qualifying were omitted.  Although the Australian has high-speed oval experience in other ACCUS-sanctioned events, NASCAR rejected Davison because he lacked drafting experience in similar cars in regards to the adverse conditions rules in effect after the pandemic.

Qualifying
Martin Truex Jr. was awarded the pole for the race as determined by a random draw.

Starting Lineup

Race

Stage Results

Stage One
Laps: 60

Stage Two
Laps: 60

Final Stage Results

Stage Three
Laps: 68

Race statistics
 Lead changes: 56 among 19 different drivers
 Cautions/Laps: 9 for 31
 Red flags: 1 for 57 minutes and 18 seconds
 Time of race: 3 hours, 27 minutes and 28 seconds
 Average speed:

Media

Television
Fox Sports covered their 20th race at the Talladega Superspeedway. Mike Joy and six-time Talladega winner – and all-time restrictor plate race wins record holder – Jeff Gordon covered the race from the Fox Sports studio in Charlotte. Jamie Little and Vince Welch handled the pit road duties. Larry McReynolds provided insight from the Fox Sports studio in Charlotte.

Radio
MRN had the radio call for the race which was also be simulcast on Sirius XM NASCAR Radio. Alex Hayden and Jeff Striegle called the race in the booth when the field raced through the tri-oval. Dave Moody called the race from the Sunoco spotters stand outside turn 2 when the field raced through turns 1 and 2. Mike Bagley called the race from a platform inside the backstretch when the field raced down the backstretch. Kurt Becker called the race from the Sunoco spotters stand outside turn 4 when the field races through turns 3 and 4. Winston Kelley and Steve Post worked pit road for the radio side.

Standings after the race

Drivers' Championship standings

Manufacturers' Championship standings

Note: Only the first 16 positions are included for the driver standings.
. – Driver has clinched a position in the NASCAR Cup Series playoffs.

References

GEICO 500
GEICO 500
GEICO 500
NASCAR races at Talladega Superspeedway
NASCAR controversies